Albion is an unincorporated community located in the Town of Albion, Dane County, Wisconsin, United States.

History
Isaac Brown, an early resident of Albion, named the community after his hometown of Albion, New York.

Albion is the site of the former Albion Academy. Founded by Seventh Day Baptists, the school was later operated by the Norwegian Evangelical Lutheran Church of America. The school closed in 1918. In 1928, the Town of Albion purchased the buildings. In 1959, the academy property was turned over to the Albion Academy Historical Society, which operates a museum on the site.

References

Further reading 
 Cornwall, A. R. "Albion" in Madison, Dane County and Surrounding Towns. Madison: Wm. J. Park, 1877, pp. 283–290.
 Emery, J. Q. "Albion Academy". The Wisconsin Magazine of History, vol. 7, no. 3 (March 1924): 303–319.

External links 
 Albion Academy Historical Society
 Albion Academy history

Unincorporated communities in Dane County, Wisconsin
Unincorporated communities in Wisconsin